The Massachusetts Lottery was established on September 27, 1971, following the legalization of gambling by the Massachusetts General Court, the legislature of the Commonwealth. The Lottery is administered by a commission of 5 members, who include the Treasurer and Receiver-General (who serves as chairperson), the Secretary of the Massachusetts Department of Public Safety, and the Comptroller, who serve on an ex officio basis. The Governor appoints the other 2 members. It is a member of the North American Association of State and Provincial Lotteries (NASPL) since 1972.

As with most U.S. lotteries, the Bay State's lottery games require players to be at least 18 years old.

Drawings are broadcast on WBZ-TV (channel 4) the CBS-station in the Boston television market.

Governance 
The Massachusetts Lottery is run by the Massachusetts State Lottery Commission (MSLC). The Commission is made up of a five-member commissioners that includes the state treasurer as chairperson, the secretary of public safety, the state comptroller, and two gubernatorial appointees. An Exec. Director is appointed by the State's Treasure albeit with the Governor of Massachusetts' approval. The Director of the Lottery reports directly to the Treasurer and Receiver General of the Commonwealth of Massachusetts who sits as the Chair of the MSLC.

Current draw games

In-house draw games

The Numbers Game 
The Numbers Game is played twice daily. It draws 4 1-digit numbers, bets can be made on a 1-digit and/or 2-digit number. 3-digit numbers are "first 3" or "last 3," as a 3-digit number is not drawn separately. Minimum wagers are 25 cents on a 3-digit or 4-digit number, and 50 cents on a 2-digit number or 1-digit.

Payouts are on a pari-mutuel basis, the payout percentage is 60% on 1- and 2-digit wagers, 70% on 3-digit bets, and 50% on a 4-digit number.

Keno 
Keno is mainly played at retailers that are equipped with game monitors, although it is available at every location. Keno started on September 30, 1993. 5 minutes apart of drawing started on September 30, 1993 and ended on February 28, 2003 after 475,622 games. On February 20, 2003, Keno announced that starting on March 1, 2003, it would modify from 5 minutes apart of drawing to 4 minutes apart of drawing. Prizes and options vary. 101 games were drawn for Keno on December 22, 1995 at 12:00 p.m. to 8:25 p.m. which is the least, and 300 games were drawn for Keno since November 24, 2004 at 5:00 a.m. to 1:00 a.m. On March 31, 2021, 316 games were drawn from 5:00 a.m. to 2:00 a.m., the most in a single day in the history of the game.

The Wheel of Luck 
This game launched on January 19, 2023 as a replacement for All or Nothing. Meant to be similar to roulette, players can select an individual number between 1 and 36, which pays 25 times their wager upon a hit, choose all red or black or all odd or even numbers, which each pay 1.5 times their wager upon a hit, two out of the three options or all three options on a single ticket. An animated roulette-style wheel spins for each drawing, in which a ball will land on a random number. Like Keno, a game is played every 4 minutes. Unlike Keno, and in fact every other draw game that the Lottery runs, there is no option for quick-picks.

Mass Cash 
On July 17, 2011, Mass Cash expanded to daily drawings. 5 numbers 1 through 35 are drawn. Top prize is $100,000 (with a $1 million liability limit). The game is similar to neighboring Connecticut's Cash 5 basic game (without the Kicker). 4 numbers wins $250, 3 numbers, $10.

Megabucks Doubler 
Megabucks Doubler is drawn Wednesdays and Saturdays.
6 numbers from 1 through 49 are chosen. The jackpot starts at $500,000, unlike previous versions of the game, there is a cash option. Matching 5 out of 6 wins $2,500 ($5,000 with doubler). Matching 4 out of 6 wins $100 ($200 with doubler). Matching 3 out of 6 wins $2 ($4 with doubler).

Multi-jurisdictional games

Lucky for Life 

In 2009, the Connecticut Lottery introduced Lucky4Life, which became a regional game,
Lucky for Life, three years later when the game expanded to include Maine, New Hampshire, Vermont, Rhode Island, and Massachusetts.

In January 2015, Lucky for Life became a "quasi-national" game, as of 2017 it is offered in 25 states and the District of Columbia.

Mega Millions 

On September 6, 1996, Illinois, Georgia, Virginia, Maryland, Michigan, and Massachusetts began a jackpot game, then called The Big Game. The current name, Mega Millions, was adopted in 2002, with The Big Game name retired soon after. The jackpot starts at $15 million. Games are $1 each, or $2 with the Megaplier option, which became available in Massachusetts in 2011.

The current version of the game began in 2013.
In October 2017, the format for Mega Millions will change again, among the changes is a $2 price point ($3 with the Megaplier). Massachusetts will be among the game's lotteries offering the Just the Jackpot option ($3 for two game), such a ticket is eligible for only the jackpot.

Powerball 

Powerball began in 1992.
Massachusetts added Powerball on February 3, 2010.

Instant Tickets 
The Lottery offers scratch tickets with price points of $1, $2, $5, $10, $20, $30 and $50. Top prizes range from $5,000 to $25 million. "Cash for Life" tickets offer the chance to win $500 to $10,000 a week for life.

Former Games

Mass Millions 
Mass Millions was introduced in 1987. Similar to Megabucks, it was played the same way where players picked 6 numbers out of a field of 42, however, a bonus number was drawn during each drawing, drawings were held on Tuesday and Friday nights. Matching all 6 regular numbers won the jackpot. 5 out of 6 plus the bonus number won $100,000, 5 out of 6 won $5,000, 4 out of 6 won $100, and 3 out of 6 won $2. This game was replaced by Cash Winfall in 2004.

The Daily Race Game 
The Daily Game Race was played much the same as Keno. It used a horserace-themed Keno-style computer monitor. The Daily Race Game started on April 2, 2007 and ended on June 11, 2013, due to poor sales and players' preference for poker.

Cash Winfall 
Cash Winfall was drawn Mondays and Thursdays. 6 numbers 1 through 46 were chosen. The jackpot began at $500,000, it always was paid in lump sum. Lower-tier prizes were $4,000, $150, or $5 for matching 5, 4, or 3 numbers respectively, 2 numbers won a Cash Winfall bet. If the jackpot reached $2 million and was not won, the jackpot was "rolled down" with the secondary prizes increased.

After the Boston Globe published reports of individual stores selling millions of dollars in tickets, state officials suspended the game, suspecting organized crime involvement. Investigations revealed that the profiteers were a retired couple from Michigan (who had exploited the same system when that state's lottery had the Winfall game) and a group of MIT college students who, by legally exploiting elements of the game, were practically guaranteed to win profits of approximately 20% when tickets were bought in rolldown conditions. The story would be adapted into the 2022 Paramount+ film "Jerry & Marge Go Large."

Cash Winfall ended on January 26, 2012.

Jackpot Poker 
This is a poker-themed game with a side bet. Jackpot Poker started on June 17, 2013 and ended on June 30, 2016 after 318,953 games, and was replaced with All or Nothing 2 weeks and 4 days later on July 18, 2016. The basic game costs $1, if the computer-generated "hand" is a Royal Flush, the player wins $25,000. Smaller prizes are for other poker hands. A $2 wager is eligible for the Progressive Jackpot option, the minimum jackpot is $100,000.

All or Nothing 
All or Nothing (stylized as ALL OR NOTHING) was a game where bettors selected 12 numbers from a pool of 24. The drawing also consisted of 12 numbers and paid out if 0-4 numbers or 8-12 numbers were matched. If bettors matched 5, 6, or 7 numbers, the most likely amounts to be matched, there would be no prize. Matching all 12 or none of the 12 paid out the jackpot (hence the name All or Nothing), which was $100,000. Other prizes included $2, $4, $25, and $400. Like in Keno, there was 1 drawing every 4 minutes. All or Nothing began drawing on July 18, 2016, following the cession of Jackpot Poker, and ended on January 4, 2023, after 702,010 games across its 6 year run. It was replaced by The Wheel of Luck 2 weeks and 1 day afterwards on January 19, 2023.

Claiming prizes 
For each prize of less than $600, players may collect from either a Lottery retailer or the Lottery itself. Prizes of $600 or more must be collected from the Lottery, via claim form. Prizes from $601 to $103,000 can be claimed at the Lottery's regional offices and headquarters, while prizes from $601 to $5,000 can be claimed with the Lottery's mobile app via mobile cashing. Prizes over $103,000 must be claimed at the Lottery's headquarters in Dorchester. Prizes up to $50,000 can also be claimed by mail.

Claim period 
For instant tickets, the claim period usually ends 1 year after the game's end-of-sale date. For draw games, like Powerball, Mega Millions, Megabucks Doubler and Mass Cash, the claim period lasts for one year after the draw.

Payment options 
The state's lottery is unusual in that it withholds 5% on prizes over $600, instead of only over $5,000. The Federal withholding on prizes of at least $5,000 is 25%.

See also 
 Gambling in Massachusetts
 Lotteries in the United States
 Lottery wheeling
 Lottery payouts
 Lump sum
 Structured settlement
 Annuity (finance theory)

References

External links 
 Massachusetts Lottery

1971 establishments in Massachusetts
Government agencies established in 1971
Economy of Massachusetts
Lottery
State lotteries of the United States